Ernesto "Tino" Crotti (18 July 1936 – 1990) was an Italian ice hockey player. He competed in the men's tournament at the 1956 Winter Olympics.

References

1936 births
1990 deaths
Ice hockey players at the 1956 Winter Olympics
Ice hockey people from Milan
Italian ice hockey players
Olympic ice hockey players of Italy